It Happened to Jane is a 1959 American romantic comedy film starring Doris Day, Jack Lemmon, and Ernie Kovacs, directed by Richard Quine, and written by Norman Katkov and Max Wilk. The film was co-produced by Quine and Day's husband at the time, Martin Melcher.

The film was re-released in 1961, with the title Twinkle and Shine.

Plot
In May 1959, in the town of Cape Anne, Maine, a foul-up by the Eastern & Portland Railroad (E&P) results in the death of 300 lobsters shipped by Jane Osgood, an attractive, widowed businesswoman with two children. She gets her lawyer and friend, George Denham, to go after the E&P to pay damages after her customer, the Marshalltown Country Club, refuses all future orders.

In the E&P office in New York City, railroad executive Harry Foster Malone learns about the Osgood lawsuit. Due to the budget cuts Malone had instituted, there had been no station agent at Marshalltown to receive Jane's lobsters. Malone sends employees Crawford Sloan and Selwyn Harris to Cape Anne to deal with the situation. The two attorneys offer Jane $700 in compensation, but Jane turns it down because the loss to her business reputation is more than that.

Jane wins in court, but E&P appeals the case to the state Supreme Court in Augusta, Maine. George files a writ of execution to force payment and take possession of the train, Old 97, in lieu of payment.

Jane is interviewed by local newspaper reporter Matilda Runyon, who then calls the Daily Mirror in New York. Top reporter Larry Hall is sent to Cape Anne for the story. Television stations also want to interview Jane. Malone retaliates by charging Jane rent for the siding on which the train is sitting. In a charming scene, Jane and George are shown singing an original song, "Be Prepared", to a pack of local cub scouts at a forested picnic.

Jane travels to New York to appear on ABC, NBC, and CBS, including the show I've Got a Secret. Fearful of bad publicity, Malone finally gives in and cancels the rent, but gives Jane the train. Meanwhile, George becomes increasingly jealous when he learns that Larry in New York is attracted to Jane and has proposed marriage to her. Jane receives telegrams of support from the American public, and the Marshalltown club, which had earlier reneged, now promises to continue business with her.

Back in Cape Anne, during a packed town meeting, Jane learns that Malone has ordered all his trains to bypass the town and has also given Jane 48 hours to remove Old 97 from the track. With service ended, local merchants will find it difficult to get their merchandise. Jane runs away and George, in an impassioned speech, scolds the townspeople for turning against her.

Realizing that Old 97 is just the way to deliver the lobsters, Jane and George persuade everybody to fill up the train's tender with coal from their homes. George recruits his uncle Otis, a retired E&P engineer, to engineer the train.

Old 97 sets off with Jane, her children, and George (who shovels coal to the engine), to deliver lobsters on board to customers in several distant towns. Malone does everything possible to delay them, even as several of his office staff resign, seeing him as a villain. Jane becomes upset at the roundabout route Malone is forcing them to take. Eventually, the coal runs out, stopping Old 97 and blocking traffic.

Just then, Malone arrives by helicopter, after hearing that the train is stalled. Jane scolds him for his underhanded actions. He had won, but found victory bittersweet. Malone finally agrees to Jane's demands. Jane and George tell him to come along so he cannot cause any more trouble. He finally shows his good side by helping shovel coal. Larry and a photographer are in Marshall Town when the train arrives. George kisses Jane in front of Larry, and she agrees to marry George and remain in Cape Anne.

After the wedding, as George is being sworn in as the new first selectman, a badly needed fire engine pulls into town, a present from Malone.

Cast

Production
Old 97 is based on the J-Class 2-8-2 steam locomotives that used to run on the New Haven Railroad. Old 97 was a common nickname for steam locomotives that had the number 97 on them (see, for example, the popular song “The Wreck of the Old 97”).

The movie was mostly filmed in Chester, Connecticut. Some scenes were filmed in Southington, Connecticut, Plainville, Connecticut, and Plainfield, Connecticut. The final scene filmed at downtown Chester Connecticut was about 1 mile from the train station used in the movie. The locomotive in the final scene was a wooden prop built near where the final scene was filmed. People from all over Connecticut were invited to be extras in the movie.

The producers had difficulty deciding on the film's title. It was initially called Miss Casey Jones and then That Jane from Maine.
The film was re-released in 1961 with another title Twinkle and Shine.

Songs
 "It Happened To Jane", performed by Doris Day
 "Be Prepared", performed by Day
 "I've Been Working' On The Railroad"

Novelization
With a publication date of January, 1959—well in advance of the film's release, as was common custom of the era—a paperback novelization of the screenplay was published by Gold Medal Books, under the film's then-working title That Jane From Maine. The author was renowned crime and western novelist Marvin H. Albert, who also made something of a cottage industry out of movie tie-ins. He seems to have been the most prolific screenplay novelizer of the late '50s through mid '60s, and, during that time, the preeminent specialist at light comedy; and his rendering of That Jane from Maine is typically instantly engaging and spirited. The front cover features a prominent color still of Jack Lemmon and Doris Day in the center, and in the lower right corner, a black and white cameo of Ernie Kovacs. B&W stills of Doris Day with Garry Moore and Dave Garroway, and a cameo of Bill Cullen, adorn the back cover. The cover price is 25¢. The copyright is assigned to the screenwriters. The book was never reprinted under the film's final title.

References

External links
 
 
 
 
 

1959 romantic comedy films
1959 films
American romantic comedy films
Columbia Pictures films
1950s English-language films
Films scored by George Duning
Films directed by Richard Quine
Films set in New York City
Films set in Maine
Films shot in Connecticut
1950s American films
Films about the Boy Scouts of America